Nikolai Alexandrovich Romanov (May 12, 1957, Pushkin town near Leningrad) is a Russian and Soviet painter, who lives and works in Saint Petersburg.

Biography 

Nikolai Alexandrovich Romanov was born on May 12, 1957 in Pushkin near Leningrad. In 1980 he graduated from Art College after Vladimir Serov in Leningrad.

In 1987 Nikolai Romanov graduated from department of painting of Repin Institute of Arts with Silver Medal, pupil of Evsey Moiseenko.

Since 1985 Romanov had participated in Art Exhibitions, mostly as a master of lyrical landscape. He worked in technique of oil painting, tempera, pastel, watercolors, and pencil drawing. In 1990 he was admitted to the Leningrad Union of Soviet Artists.

Nikolai Romanov is a winner of Silver Medal of the Academy of Art (1987), Silver (2008) and Gold Medal (2012) ″For the Contribution to Domestic Culture″ of the International Federation of Artists. Romanov is one of two Russian artists who was invited to participation in Festival, to the devoted 100 Anniversary of the Fauvism in 2007 (Collioure, France).

Paintings of Nikolai Romanov reside in the Art museum of Academy of Arts in Saint Petersburg, State Art Museum of Novosibirsk, in Palace of Arts of Perpignan (France), Museum of Art in Cambrai (France), in Ivanovo Regional Art Museum, as well as in private collections in Russia, Italy, China, Cyprus, Norway, Korea, USA, Germany, Sweden, Spain, New Zealand, Australia, Greece, Chili, Austria, UK and other countries.

Awards 
 Silver Medal of Repin Academy of Art (Saint Petersburg, 1987) 
 Silver Medal "For the Contribution to Domestic Culture" of the International Federation of Artists (2008)
 Gold Medal "For the Contribution to Domestic Culture" of the International Federation of Artists  (2012)

See also
 Leningrad School of Painting
 Saint Petersburg Union of Artists

Gallery

References

Sources 

 Sergei V. Ivanov. The Leningrad School of Painting. Essays on the History. St Petersburg, ARKA Gallery Publishing, 2019. P.142, 326, 336, 354, 390—393, 396.

External links 
 Paintings of Nikolai Romanov. VIDEO
 Nikolai Alexandrovich Romanov. Biography
 Eugenia Logvinova - Nikolai Romanov

1957 births
20th-century Russian painters
Russian male painters
21st-century Russian painters
Soviet painters
Members of the Leningrad Union of Artists
Repin Institute of Arts alumni
Painters from Saint Petersburg
Living people
20th-century Russian male artists
21st-century Russian male artists